Desmond Lyttle (born 24 September 1971) is an English former football player and manager.

He started his career with Leicester City, but dropped into non-League football with Worcester City in 1991. A good season earned him a move to Welsh side Swansea City, and in 1993 he moved on to Nottingham Forest. After six years with the club, including a spell in the Premier League, he signed with Watford. After just a season he switched to West Bromwich Albion. In 2003, he transferred to Northampton Town, and a year later he left the Football League for the second and final time, signing with Forest Green Rovers. He transferred to Worcester City in 2005, before joining Tamworth in 2007.

In 2010, he was appointed caretaker manager at Tamworth, before being made player-manager on a full-time basis. He resigned the following year, claiming he was being undermined by the club's directors. He was appointed manager of Hucknall Town in October 2011, before departing seven months later. He later had a spell as first team coach at York City, before becoming the head football coach at Thomas Telford School.

Playing career

Early career
Born in Wolverhampton, Staffordshire, Lyttle started his professional football career with Leicester City in 1990, but after failing to make the first team, he was released at the end of 1991. Lyttle was picked up by Worcester City in August 1991 on a free transfer. He spent one season with Worcester, and a number of good performances alerted bigger clubs of Lyttle's ability. In July 1992, he joined newly promoted Second Division outfit Swansea City from Worcester for a fee of £12,500. He spent a full season with City, and was part of the team that defied the odds to finish fifth in their first season back in the Second Division. Lyttle made 46 appearances for Swansea and found the net on one occasion.

Nottingham Forest
Lyttle was signed by relegated Nottingham Forest for a fee of £375,000 in July 1993 to become one of Frank Clark's first signings, following the end of Brian Clough's 18-year reign. Lyttle was a member of the team that won instant promotion back to the Premier League in the 1993–94 season, finishing second in the First Division. Forest finished in third place the following season, in their return to the Premier League, before falling to ninth-place in 1995–96 and then suffering relegation in bottom place at the end of the 1996–97 season. Lyttle stayed with Forest, despite the relegation. Forest however lost some other players, noticeably Lyttle's defensive partner Stuart Pearce, who joined Newcastle United. Manager, Dave Bassett still managed to guide Forest back to the Premier League at the first time of asking, as they won promotion as champions.

Lyttle stayed on at Forest for another crack at the Premier League, although he spent a month out on loan at Port Vale, but after a dismal start to the season, Bassett was fired in January 1999. Forest then appointed Ron Atkinson in a bid to save the club, although he was unable to steer the club away from relegation and for the third time in seven seasons Forest were relegated as the bottom club. Lyttle vied for the right-back berth alongside French import Thierry Bonalair, and he left to pursue his career elsewhere at the end of the season.

Watford
Lyttle then joined newly promoted Premier League outfit Watford on July 1999. He failed to fit in at the club however, and was often a substitute. He made only eleven appearances for the club.

West Bromwich Albion
In March 2000, Lyttle was sent on loan to West Bromwich Albion for the remainder of the season, signing just two days before the transfer deadline. He helped ensure the club's survival in the First Division, and in turn earned himself a permanent contract in June 2000. He was a regular in the squad during the 2000–01 season, employed by manager Gary Megson as a right wing-back, and combined well with Ruel Fox down the right-hand side to help Albion reach the play-offs. The following season Lyttle lost his place to Slovakian Igor Bališ, with Lyttle used mainly as a substitute during the second half of the season as Albion were promoted to the Premier League. During 2002–03 Lyttle slipped even further down the pecking order, managing only two starts and two substitute appearances in the Premier League. Following the club's relegation back to the First Division, Lyttle was released by the club in May 2003. In all, Lyttle made 67 appearances for Albion, his only goal for the club coming in a 3–1 home defeat to Fulham on 9 December 2000.

Later career
He began training with AFC Telford United, and was linked to a longer stay at the club. However, he joined Northampton Town in November 2003. He spent the remainder of the 2003–04 season with Northampton, making a total of 27 appearances before leaving at the end of the season. His next move was to Conference National side Forest Green Rovers in September 2004, after rejecting fellow Conference club Burton Albion. Lyttle spent one season with Forest Green, making 36 appearances and scoring once in the FA Cup against AFC Bournemouth, but was released after not being offered a new contract at the end of the 2004–05 season.

Lyttle joined Conference North side Worcester City for his second spell for the club, where he was the club's captain. He spent two seasons with the club but was not offered a new contract by Worcester manager Andy Preece at the end of the 2006–07 season, due to the club's budget having been reduced. He was named the club's "Players' Player of the Year" for both of his seasons at the club. In July 2007, it was confirmed that Lyttle had joined Conference North side Tamworth after a successful trial period. Lyttle was part of the Tamworth promotion squad that were promoted to the Conference National at the end of the 2008–09 season. He also scored a late equaliser against high-flying Luton Town in 2009–10, all but ending Luton's chances of automatic promotion.

Coaching career
In May 2010, Lyttle confirmed that he had applied for the vacant AFC Telford United manager's job following the dismissal of Rob Smith; however former England international winger Andy Sinton was instead appointed.

Tamworth
Following the departure of Tamworth manager Gary Mills and assistant Darron Gee to York City on 13 October 2010, Lyttle was announced as caretaker player-manager. The following day Lyttle brought in former West Bromwich Albion and Tamworth teammate Bob Taylor as a coach to assist him. Despite failing to find victory in his five league games, he was appointed manager on a full-time basis on 30 November after leading the club into the Second Round of the FA Cup with wins over Grimsby Town and Crewe Alexandra. However, with just four games remaining until the end of the season, Lyttle resigned from the club. Lyttle left his position as he felt it was untenable after claiming the club's board tried to bring in former York manager Martin Foyle as an adviser for the remaining four games.

Hucknall Town
Lyttle returned to football as manager of Hucknall Town, replacing Tommy Brookbanks at the Northern Premier League Division One South club on 13 October 2011. He steered the club to an 11th-place finish in 2011–12, before leaving 'on amicable terms' in May 2012 after the club decided to find a manager with a more in-depth knowledge of the local non-league scene.

York City
Lyttle was appointed as first team coach at newly promoted League Two side York on 3 July 2012, being reunited with Mills and Gee, the management team Lyttle played under at Tamworth. He left the club on 4 March 2013, two days after Mills was sacked as manager.

Thomas Telford School
In 2013, Lyttle became head football coach at Thomas Telford School in Telford, Shropshire. In 2015–16, the school's teams reached 13 national finals. His former pupils include Morgan Gibbs-White, who turned professional at Wolverhampton Wanderers.

Career statistics

Notes
Table is incomplete: some season data for Worcester City, Nottingham Forest, Stourport Swifts, and Tamworth are missing.

Managerial statistics

Honours
Nottingham Forest
 Football League First Division second-place promotion: 1993–94
 Football League First Division: 1997–98

West Bromwich Albion
 Football League First Division second-place promotion: 2001–02

Tamworth
 Conference North: 2008–09

References

1971 births
Living people
Footballers from Wolverhampton
English footballers
Association football defenders
Leicester City F.C. players
Worcester City F.C. players
Swansea City A.F.C. players
Nottingham Forest F.C. players
Port Vale F.C. players
Watford F.C. players
West Bromwich Albion F.C. players
Stourport Swifts F.C. players
Northampton Town F.C. players
Forest Green Rovers F.C. players
Tamworth F.C. players
Premier League players
English Football League players
National League (English football) players
Association football player-managers
English football managers
Tamworth F.C. managers
Hucknall Town F.C. managers
National League (English football) managers
Northern Premier League managers
Association football coaches
York City F.C. non-playing staff